NGC 6031 is an open cluster of stars in the constellation Norma. The abundance of iron in this cluster matches the abundance in the Sun, indicating that the metallicity of the cluster is essentially solar.

References

Open clusters
Norma (constellation)
6031